The 1974 St. Louis Cardinals season was the team's 55th year with the National Football League and the 15th season in St. Louis. The Cardinals scored 285 points while the defense gave up 218 points, en route to the NFC East Championship.

The 10–4 Cardinals qualified for the postseason for the first time since 1948 when the franchise was based in Chicago. It was the Cardinals' first winning season since 1970 when the Cardinals went 8–5–1. Although the Cardinals and the Washington Redskins finished with identical 10–4 records, the Cardinals won the NFC East title, because of their two victories over Washington that season.

The Cardinals won their first seven games, and were at least tied for first place from Week One to the end of the regular season.

The Cardinals would not start a season with a 7–0 record again until 2021.

Offseason

NFL draft

Roster

Hall of Fame Game
 St. Louis Cardinals 21, Buffalo Bills 13

Regular season

Schedule

Game summaries

Week 11 at Giants

Week 14

Standings

Postseason

NFC Divisional Playoff
 Minnesota Vikings 30, St. Louis Cardinals 14 

at Metropolitan Stadium, Bloomington, Minnesota

TV: CBS
Attendance: 44,626

Awards and records
Jim Hart, NFC Leader, Touchdown Passes, 20 Passes

Milestones
Terry Metcalf, 2000 Combined Net Yards (718 Rush Yards, 377 Pass Receiving Yards, 340 Punt Return Yards, 623 Kick Return Yards)

References

Cardinals on Pro Football Reference
Cardinals on jt-sw.com

St. Louis
Arizona Cardinals seasons
NFC East championship seasons